Bethel High School is located in Spanaway, Washington. It is Bethel School District's oldest high school, dating back to 1952.

Academics
AP classes offered are Statistics, Calculus, Psychology, Literature and Composition, Language and Composition, Government and Politics, and Biology.

Athletics
Bethel is part of the Bethel School District along with Spanaway Lake High School and Graham-Kapowsin High School.  Bethel competes in the Pierce County League (PCL) 3A in Washington's West Central District.

History

A speech given during the 1983 ASB Elections resulted in disciplinary action against the orator, who then filed a lawsuit against the school district in an effort to defend the First Amendment right of free speech for students in public schools. The case was eventually taken up by the Supreme Court of the United States of America, who upheld the decision of Bethel High School administrators in punishing the student.

Notable alumni
Mike Blowers, MLB player 1989–1999, broadcaster
Corey Belser, NBA European player, 2006 CI NCAA Defensive POY
Derrike Cope, NASCAR Driver 1982-current, 1990 Daytona 500 winner
LeiLani Jones, Miss Washington USA 2007
Caesar Rayford, NFL and CFL player
Rick Story, UFC fighter
Ezra Cleveland, NFL player for the Minnesota Vikings
KC Montero, Filipino-American actor and television personality
Morgan Hicks, 2004 Olympian and rifle coach at University of Nebraska.

References

High schools in Pierce County, Washington
South Puget Sound League
Public high schools in Washington (state)